Uncle Wonderful is the thirteenth studio album by American singer-songwriter Janis Ian, and her first after departing from Columbia Records.

Recorded between 1981 and 1983 at a time when Janis was seeking a break from the music business after continual recording and touring between 1974 and 1981, according to Society’s Child: My Autobiography Janis cannot recall the details of making Uncle Wonderful, for she was focused upon the death of her grandmother and was consistently travelling from coast to coast. Uncle Wonderful would be rejected by Columbia – with whom Ian at the time had a contract for four more albums – and initially released only in New Zealand in 1985 and Australia in 1986. Uncle Wonderful would not receive a release in Europe until 1995 after Janis’ second comeback with Breaking Silence, and would in 2010 receive a further UK release by Edsel Records as part of a compilation with her two preceding albums Night Rains and Restless Eyes. Although she would return to performing in the United States in 1986, playing mostly her new material in a series of shows supported by the then-unknown Indigo Girls, Uncle Wonderful has never been released there.

Reviews
The only review of Uncle Wonderful to be published at the time of its issue was by Green Guide journalist Paul Speelman, who did not grade the record but noticed its extremely dark subject matter, with songs about such issues as rape, incest, sexual greed, and the bringing-up of children.

More contemporary reviews have been critical of the extremely dated sound but have noticed how Uncle Wonderful’s lyrics foreshadow the topic matter Janis Ian would pursue on her 1990s and 2000s music.

Track listing

Personnel

 Janis Ian – vocals, backing vocals, guitar, acoustic guitar, keyboards, piano, producer
 Cyro Baptista – percussion
 Jeff Berlin – bass
 Kim Bullard – keyboards
 Leslie Collman-Smith – backing vocals
 Paulinho Da Costa – percussion
 Kal David – backing vocals
 Howard "Buzz" Feiten – electric guitar
 Artie Funaro – producer, electric guitar, backing vocals
 Tony Horowitz – bass
 Terry Jennings – drum machine, engineer, percussion
 Marv Kanarek – drums
 Chris Page – keyboards
 Peter Schless – keyboards
Rick Shlosser – drums
 Leland Sklar – bass
 Joe Turano – backing vocals

Charts

Notes

References

Janis Ian albums
1985 albums
Albums produced by Brooks Arthur